Wusi  (Wusi-Kerepua) is an Oceanic language spoken on the west coast of Espiritu Santo Island in Vanuatu.

References

Espiritu Santo languages
Languages of Vanuatu